The Hikari danio is a new species of danio recently discovered in Burma, and first exported in 2002/2003. It is still awaiting a scientific name, and is temporarily referred to as Danio sp. "Hikari". It has blue and yellow varieties with the yellow being male and the blue female. It appears to be closely related to Danio kerri. It may be a subspecies of this fish, but this does not seem to be the case.

 Maximum length: 2 in (5 cm)
 Colors: Blue, silver, yellow
 Temperature preference: 20-25 °C
 pH preference: 6 to 7 
 Hardness preference: Soft to medium 
 Salinity preference: Low to medium 
 Compatibility: Good but fast, like most danios
 Lifespan: Typically two to three years  
 Ease of keeping: Moderate 
 Ease of breeding: Moderate to hard

See also
Danio
Danionins

External links
Danio sp. "hikari"

References

Danios
Undescribed vertebrate species